Roo Powell (born March 30, 1983) is an American writer and advocate. She was born in Hong Kong, the daughter of Gareth Powell.

Powell began writing online in 2010, which led to larger writing and branding projects as well as speaking engagements. From 2013 to 2019, she wrote for Adweek, a weekly American advertising trade publication, and spoke at industry conferences like SXSW and BlogHer. Powell has worked in the technology industry since 2017, running creative for and advising companies that use artificial intelligence to analyze and detect toxic behavior online. She serves as an advisor to Spectrum Labs.

Powell is the founder of SOSA, a nonprofit organization focused on the prevention of online child sex abuse and exploitation. In October 2021, it was announced that Powell and SOSA would be featured in a six-part docuseries, Undercover Underage, which debuted in November 2021 on Discovery+ and made its linear broadcast premiere in February 2022. In March 2022, it was announced that Undercover Underage was renewed for a Season 2.

References

External links 
 
Personal website

1983 births
Living people
American people of Welsh descent
Hong Kong people
American people of Filipino descent
21st-century American women